Daisuke Ito (伊藤 大介, born April 18, 1987) is a Japanese footballer who plays as a central midfielder for Criacao Shinjuku. He is known as a free kick specialist.

Club statistics
Updated to 23 February 2018.

References

External links

1987 births
Living people
Juntendo University alumni
Association football people from Chiba Prefecture
Japanese footballers
J2 League players
J3 League players
JEF United Chiba players
Oita Trinita players
Fagiano Okayama players
SC Sagamihara players
Association football midfielders